Zubairu is a Nigerian surname. Notable people with the surname include:

Abdul Zubairu (born 1998), Nigerian footballer
Idris Zubairu, Anglican bishop in Nigeria
Tanko Zubairu, 20th century Nigerian military administrator 

Surnames of African origin